The 2000 World's Strongest Man was the 23rd edition of World's Strongest Man and was won by Janne Virtanen from Finland. It was his first title after finishing second the previous year. Svend Karlsen from Norway finished second after finishing third the previous year, and 1998 winner Magnus Samuelsson from Sweden finished third. The contest was held in Sun City, South Africa.

Qualifying heats
Qualifying heats in World's Strongest Man involve a series of six events. The field is divided into groups of six competitors with the top two in each of the groups reaching the ten man final. A win in an event gives a competitor 6 points, second place gets 5, and so on (4,3,2,1).

Heat 1

Source

events: Super Yoke, Africa Stone, Power Stairs, Boulder Holder (Connan Circle), Axle Press, Atlas Stones

Heat 2

Source

Events: Tyre Flip, Africa Stone, Car Lift (Car Deadlift Hold), Boulder Holder (Connan Circle), Fingal's Fingers, Atlas Stones

Heat 3

Source

events: Tyre Flip, Africa Stone, Power Stairs, Boulder Holder (Connan Circle), Axle Press, Atlas Stones

Heat 4

Source

Events: Super Yoke, Africa Stone, Car Lift (Car Deadlift Hold), Boulder Holder (Connan Circle), Fingal's Fingers, Atlas Stones

Heat 5

Source

events: Tyre Flip, Africa Stone, Power Stairs, Boulder Holder (Connan Circle), Axle Press, Atlas Stones

Final results

Source

References

External links
 Official site

2000 in South African sport
World's Strongest Man